Karczowice may refer to the following places in Poland:
Karczowice, Lower Silesian Voivodeship (south-west Poland)
Karczowice, Lesser Poland Voivodeship (south Poland)